Douglas Milmine  (3 May 1921 – 28 February 2017) was the Anglican Bishop of Paraguay from 1973 to 1985.

Education
Milmine was educated at Sutton Valence School and St Peter's Hall, Oxford; and was ordained in 1947.

War service
Milmine served in the RAFVR from 1941 to 1945. In 1943, while commanding a Halifax bomber, he was shot down and eventually captured: he was then a  Prisoner of War until hostilities ceased.
“Actually, it wasn’t that bad – if you could survive boarding at an English public school then you could survive prison camp!”

Early ministry

He began his ordained ministry with curacies at St Peter and St James in Ilfracombe and St Paul's at Slough.

Time in South America

In 1954 he moved to South America where he served in Chile, Bolivia and Peru and finally (until his ordination to the episcopate) as Archdeacon of North Chile, Bolivia and Peru.

Personal life

Milmine married Margaret Rosalind "Ros" Whitley in 1945; and they had 4 children, 13 grandchildren and 13 great grandchildren. She died in 2018 at the age of 97.

Retirement

On his return to England Milmine retired to Eastbourne; and served as an Assistant Bishop in the Diocese of Chichester.

He died on 28 February 2017 at the age of 95. An obituary appeared in the Telegraph on 16 March 2017.

References

1921 births
2017 deaths
People educated at Sutton Valence School
Alumni of St Peter's College, Oxford
Anglican archdeacons in South America
Anglican bishops of Paraguay
Commanders of the Order of the British Empire
Royal Air Force Volunteer Reserve personnel of World War II
Royal Air Force pilots of World War II
British World War II bomber pilots
Shot-down aviators
British World War II prisoners of war
World War II prisoners of war held by Germany